Yaron Gottlieb is a French-Israeli lawyer who has expertise in maritime piracy, and has done extensive work for Interpol and the UN. He has been quoted in numerous law reviews, including Penn State, and Harvard. He has also written for and been quoted in a number of other journals.

He has also taken an interest in destruction of religious sites, and the transition of these sites when regimes fall, and preventing extradition of people wanted for political crimes.

References 

Year of birth missing (living people)
Living people
Israeli lawyers
Piracy law
Scholars of criminal law